Ionas Pyatrauskas (born 18 May 1979) is a Belarusian professional football coach and former player of Lithuanian origin.

Honours
Belarusian Premier League champion: 1999

External links
 

1979 births
Living people
Belarusian footballers
Belarusian people of Lithuanian descent
Association football defenders
FC Smena Minsk players
FC BATE Borisov players
FC Darida Minsk Raion players
FC Minsk players
Belarusian football managers